Fort Valley is a city in and the county seat of Peach County, Georgia, United States. As of the 2020 census, the city had a population of 8,780.

The city is in the Warner Robins metropolitan area and the Macon–Warner Robins combined statistical area.

History
The town's name is a mystery, as it has never had a fort. Historians believe that the name was mistakenly changed in a transcription error when the post office was named; the area was originally thought to have been called Fox Valley.

Founded in 1836, Fort Valley was incorporated as a town in 1854 and as a city in 1907. In 1924 it was the designated seat of the newly formed Peach County.

Fort Valley was the backdrop for a Life feature story in the March 22, 1943 edition. The World War II-era story focused on the town's sponsoring of the "Ham and Egg Show," a contest held by African-American farmers to highlight ham and poultry production in Peach County, Georgia.

Geography 

Fort Valley is located at  (32.55, -83.89).

The city is located in the central part of the state along U.S. Route 341, which is the main route through the city. Georgia State Routes 49, 96, and 540 (Fall Line Freeway) also run through the city. GA-49 leads northeast  to Byron and southwest  to Marshallville. GA-96 leads east  to Warner Robins and west  to Reynolds. The Fall Line Freeway runs north of the city as a four-lane divided highway, leading northeast to Byron with GA-49 and west to Reynolds with GA-96.

Demographics

2020 census

As of the 2020 United States census, there were 8,780 people, 3,040 households, and 1,685 families residing in the city.

2000 census
As of the census of 2000, there were 8,005 people, 3,050 households, and 1,878 families residing in the city. The racial makeup of the city was 22.10% White, 74.65% African American, 0.37% Native American, 0.25% Asian, 0.05% Pacific Islander, 1.85% from other races, and 0.72% from two or more races. Hispanic or Latino people of any race were 4.37% of the population.

There were 3,050 households, out of which 30.6% had children under the age of 18 living with them, 25.9% were married couples living together, 30.9% had a female householder with no husband present, and 38.4% were non-families. 29.1% of all households were made up of individuals, and 10.4% had someone living alone who was 65 years of age or older. The average household size was 2.57 and the average family size was 3.20.

In the city, the population was spread out, with 27.3% under the age of 18, 16.9% from 18 to 24, 26.0% from 25 to 44, 18.3% from 45 to 64, and 11.4% who were 65 years of age or older. The median age was 28 years. For every 100 females, there were 86.1 males. For every 100 females age 18 and over, there were 81.8 males.

The median income for a household in the city was $19,646, and the median income for a family was $24,206. Males had a median income of $27,016 versus $20,110 for females. The per capita income for the city was $10,815. About 31.8% of families and 37.7% of the population were below the poverty line, including 44.3% of those under the age of 18 and 17.3% of those 65 and older.

Economy
Fort Valley is the corporate headquarters of the Blue Bird Corporation, a large manufacturer of activity buses and school buses, which opened its first Fort Valley facility in 1935.

Athletics

Football 

Despite being a city of less than 10,000 people, Fort Valley boasts one of the best football teams in the state. The Peach County High Trojans have played in eight state title games since 1990, and have made the playoffs every year since.

 1992 AAA State Runners-Up 
 1998 AAA State Runners-Up
 2003 AAA State Runners-Up
 2005 AAA State Champions
 2006 AAA State Champions
 2009 AAA State Champions
 2011 AAA State Runners-Up
 2017 AAA State Runners-Up

Track and field 

 1993 AAA 4x100 Relay State Champions (Greg Streeter, Jacquez Green, Marcus Robinson, Melvin Oats)

Arts and culture

Points of interest 
Massee Lane Gardens
Blue Bird Corporation's headquarters, currently their only Georgia plant

Education

Public schools
The Peach County School District holds grades pre-school to grade twelve, and consists of three elementary schools, two middle schools, and a high school. The district has 270 full-time teachers and over 3,927 students.
Byron Elementary School
Hunt Elementary School
Kay Road Elementary School
Byron Middle School
Fort Valley Middle School
Peach County High School

Colleges and universities 
The city is home to Fort Valley State University, a historically black college.

Infrastructure

Transportation

Highways
U.S. Route:
  U.S. Route 341

State Routes:
  State Route 7
  State Route 42
  State Route 49
  State Route 96

Health care
 The Medical Center of Peach County

Notable people

 Louie Crew, emeritus professor at Rutgers University, poet and activist, taught at Fort Valley State from 1973 to 1979
 Antone Davis, former National Football League offensive lineman, born in Fort Valley
 Jacquez Green, former National Football League wide receiver and punt returner, born in Fort Valley
 Harold Houser, United States Navy Rear admiral, and the 35th Governor of American Samoa, born in Fort Valley
 Edward H. Hurst, Brigadier general in the Marine Corps and recipient of Navy Cross, born in Fort Valley
 Louis Ivory, former college football running back, 2000 Walter Payton Award winner, born in Fort Valley
 Kearis Jackson, wide receiver for the Georgia Bulldogs 
 Benny Johnson, NFL player
 Pete Johnson, former NFL player
 Greg Lloyd, Sr., former NFL player, attended Fort Valley State 1983-86
 Dannie Lockett, former NFL player
 Randy McMichael, former NFL player for the San Diego Chargers, Miami Dolphins, and the St. Louis Rams
 Marcus Robinson, former National Football League wide receiver, born in Fort Valley
 Tim Watson, former American football safety in the National Football League, born in Fort Valley

References

External links
 
 Fort Valley Georgia portal style website, government, business, library, recreation and more
 City-Data.com - comprehensive statistical data and more about Fort Valley
Football
Info

1836 establishments in Georgia (U.S. state)
Cities in Georgia (U.S. state)
Micropolitan areas of Georgia (U.S. state)
Cities in Peach County, Georgia
County seats in Georgia (U.S. state)